5P or 5-P may refer to:

5p, an arm of Chromosome 5 (human)
5p- (or chromosome 5p deletion syndrome); see Cri du chat
5p, abbreviation for Five pence:
 Five pence (British decimal coin)
 Five pence (Irish decimal coin)
GSAT-5P, an Indian communications satellite
Team 5P, an animation production team
Lim-5P, a model of PZL-Mielec Lim-6
F9F-5P, a model of  Grumman F9F Panther
F6F-5P, a model of Grumman F6F Hellcat
F4U-5P, a model of Vought F4U Corsair
SV-5P, a model of  Martin Marietta X-24A
5P Mara, a model of Dassault Mirage 5
Typ 5P, a model of SEAT Toledo
PI5P, abbreviation for  Phosphatidylinositol 5-phosphate
5P, NASA ID for the Progress M-45 spacecraft
5P, a model of HP LaserJet 5
5 pillars in several contexts
5P, the production code for the 1980 Doctor Who serial State of Decay

See also
P5 (disambiguation)